List of World Yo-Yo Champions is the list of the competitors who won the World Yo-Yo Contest. This list includes non-championship divisions.

Governing bodies

Primary solo divisions

Current

1A 
Was known as A or "Single A" from 1998 to 2004.

2A 
Was known as AA or "Double A" from 1998 to 2004.

3A 
Also known as AAA or "Triple A".

4A 
Also known as "Offstring".

5A 
Also known as "Counterweight" or "Freehand".

Former

X 
The X division was separated into three new divisions (3A, 4A, 5A) in 2003.

CB

Winners table

Non-solo divisions

Current

AP 
Also known as "Artistic Performance".

Former

Team 
Was replaced by the AP division in 2002.

Additional solo divisions

Current

Women only

40 and over

Former

Ladder 
Was known as "Compulsory" in 1997 and as "Advanced/Recreational" in 1998 and 1999.

Non-yoyo divisions

SpinTop 
The SpinTop World Championships are held during the WYCC under the auspices of the International Top Spinners Association (ITSA).

Freestyle

Fixed tip

Ladder

Diabolo

Non-world championships

Fixed Axle

100m race

One-Hand Loops

Two-Hand Loops

Design contests

Mod

Iron Mod

Diabolo

Ladder (11 and under)

Ladder (12 to 16)

Ladder (17 and over)

Sport

String and Looping

7 to 8

9 to 10

11 to 12

13 to 14

15 to 16

17 to 25

26 to 45

46 to 65

66 to 106

Beginner

Advanced

Expert

String

7 to 8

9 to 10

10 & Under

11 to 12

13 to 14

15 to 16

13 to 16

17 to 29

30 to 44

46 to 65

45 & Over

Expert

Looping

7 to 8

9 to 10

10 & Under

11 to 12

13 to 14

15 to 16

13 to 16

17 to 29

30 to 44

46 to 65

45 & Over

Expert

References

External links 
 
 
 

Yo-yos
Yoyo